The Missouri State Bears basketball team is the NCAA Division I men's basketball program of Missouri State University in Springfield, Missouri. The Bears compete in the Missouri Valley Conference. They are currently coached by Dana Ford, who was hired on March 21, 2018. Missouri State plays its home games at the 11,000-seat Great Southern Bank Arena. The Bears have been a Division I school since the 1982–83 season. Prior to 2005, the school was known as Southwest Missouri State. Prior to joining Division I, they were members of the NAIA, winning national championships in 1952 and 1953, and NCAA Division II, where they were the national runner-up four times (1959, 1967, 1969, 1974). They were also champions of the 2010 CollegeInsider.com Tournament.

Conference championships
Missouri Intercollegiate Athletic Association (1912–1981) 19 
1928, 1931, 1934, 1935, 1949, 1950, 1952, 1953, 1954, 1958, 1959, 1966, 1967, 1968, 1969, 1970, 1973, 1974, 1978

Mid-Continent Conference (1982–1990) 4 
1987, 1988, 1989, 1990

Missouri Valley Conference (1990–present) 1 
1992 (Tournament), 2011 (Regular Season)

Head coaches

Retired numbers

Notes

Postseason

NCAA Division I Tournament results
The Bears have appeared in six NCAA Division I Tournaments, all as Southwest Missouri State. Their combined record is 3–6.

NCAA Division II Tournament results
The Bears appeared in ten NCAA Division II Tournaments. Their combined record is 23–10.

NAIA Tournament results
The Bears appeared in six NAIA Tournaments. Their combined record is 15–4 and are two time NAIA national champions (1952, 1953).

NIT results
The Bears have appeared in 10 National Invitation Tournaments (NIT). Their combined record is 10–10.

CIT results
The Bears have appeared in two CollegeInsider.com Postseason Tournaments (CIT). Their combined record is 4–1 and were the 2010 Champions.

References

External links